Celestino "Tino" Mancao Tugot (6 April 1910 – 18 January 2010) was a Filipino professional golfer. A local golf legend, Tugot is widely regarded as one of the best, if not the best golfers the Philippines has produced, and the first Filipino athlete to step into the White House and shake hands with US President Dwight D. Eisenhower in 1954.

Tugot won his national open title six times between 1949 and 1962, including four consecutively from 1955 and represented the Philippines in the World Cup on ten occasions.

Legacy

Del Monte Golf Course 
The final 9 holes of Del Monte Golf Course which is located in the Del Monte Plantation was designed by Tugot.

Our Mother of Perpetual Help Church 
Upon surviving the sinking of S.S Corregidor in 1941, Tugot and his wife Obdulia built a Catholic Church beside their home at Manolo Fortich in the late 1960s. The church continues to spread and inspire devotees and has since become one of the pilgrimage sites of the people of Northern Mindanao and its surrounding areas.

Professional wins

Far East Circuit win (1)
1962 Philippine Open

Other wins
This list is incomplete
1949 Philippine Open
1955 Philippine Open
1956 Philippine Open
1957 Philippine Open
1958 Philippine Open

Team appearances
World Cup (representing the Philippines): 1954, 1955, 1956, 1957, 1958, 1961, 1962, 1964, 1965, 1967

References

Filipino male golfers
Asian Tour golfers
Sportspeople from Bukidnon
1910 births
2010 deaths